State Route 152 (SR 152) is part of Maine's system of numbered state highways, located in Somerset County. It runs from SR 11 and SR 100 in Pittsfield to SR 150 in Cambridge. It was first established in 1925 and the route has not changed since.

Junction list

See also

References

External links

Floodgap Roadgap's RoadsAroundME: Maine State Route 152

152
Transportation in Somerset County, Maine